Sychesia is a genus of moths in the family Erebidae.

Species
 Sychesia coccina Jordan, 1916
 Sychesia dimidiata Jordan, 1916
 Sychesia dryas Cramer, 1775
 Sychesia erubescens Jordan, 1916
 Sychesia hora Jordan, 1916
 Sychesia melini Bryk, 1953
 Sychesia naias Jordan, 1916
 Sychesia omissus Rothschild, 1910
 Sychesia pseudodryas Rothschild, 1909
 Sychesia subtilis Butler, 1878
 Sychesia terranea Rothschild, 1909

References

Natural History Museum Lepidoptera generic names catalog

Phaegopterina
Moth genera